On 13 January 2014, retired American SWAT commander Curtis J. Reeves Jr. shot and killed retired American Gulf War veteran Chad Oulson in a Cobb Theatres movie theater in Wesley Chapel, Florida, United States. The shooting occurred during the movie previews following a brief altercation between the two men. Reeves asked Oulson to turn off his cell phone and Oulson threw popcorn at Reeves.

In 2017, Reeves' legal team attempted to use Florida's stand-your-ground law as the basis of his defense, which was initially rejected by the court. In 2022, Reeves was acquitted of second-degree murder and aggravated battery.

Death 
On 13 January 2014, Oulson and his wife Nicole were preparing to watch the movie Lone Survivor; retired law enforcement officer Curtis Reeves and his wife were watching from the row behind the Oulsons. Chad Oulson texted his daughter's babysitter; Reeves told Oulson to turn off his cellphone and to not use it in the theater. Reeves then exited the theater to complain to theater personnel, then returned to his seat. Chad Oulson threw popcorn at Reeves, who drew a .380 caliber handgun and fired, shooting Nicole Oulson in the finger and fatally wounding Chad Oulson.

Chad Oulson died later the same day.

Reactions 
According to witness Alan Hamilton, an off-duty police officer, Reeves' wife said "that was no cause to shoot anyone", to which Reeves scolded her with his finger and said "you shut your [expletive] mouth and don't say another word". Reeves insisted that he killed Chad Oulson because he felt threatened by the younger, more physically fit individual. According to several sources, Reeves was also texting during the previews, responding to a text from his son.

Trial 
In 2017, a judge ruled that Reeves could not take shelter under the Florida's Stand Your Ground law, a decision that would later be overturned on appeal, leaving the determination of self-defense to the jury. Tampa defense attorney Richard Escobar referred to the case as "the largest self-defense case ever in Florida".

Eight years after the event, in February 2022, Reeves was acquitted of second-degree murder and aggravated battery. During the trial, Reeves stated that the confrontation made him more afraid than anything else in his life, including his SWAT experience and entire law enforcement career, but prosecutors disputed that statement. Officers on the scene described Reeves' demeanor as extremely calm.

Post trial

In 2022, the Oulson Family Foundation was established to provide funds for children who have been affected by gun violence, including counseling, medical attention, and college tuition.

References

External links 

 Oulson Family Foundation official website

2014 in Florida
2014 deaths
Deaths by firearm in Florida
Deaths by person in Florida
Stand-your-ground law